Hanson or Hansson may refer to:

People 
 Hanson (surname)
 Hansson (surname)
 Hanson (wrestler), ringname of an American professional wrestler

Musical groups 
 Hanson (band), an American pop rock band
 Hanson (UK band), an English rock band
 The Hanson Brothers (band), a Canadian punk band and side project of the band Nomeansno

Companies 
 Hanson plc, a British building materials company
 Hanson Records, a record label
 Hanson Robotics, a robotics company

Places

Australia
 Hanson, South Australia, a locality
 County of Hanson, a cadastral unit
Hundred of Hanson, a cadastral unit

United States
 Hanson, Kentucky,
 Hanson, Massachusetts
 Hanson (CDP), Massachusetts, a census-designated place in Hanson, Massachusetts
 Hanson (MBTA station)
 Hanson, Oklahoma

Other uses 
 Hanson baronets, two baronetcies in the United Kingdom
 Hanson Brothers, fictional characters in the film Slap Shot
 Hanson Field, a stadium in Macomb, Illinois
 Hanson Formation, an Antarctica rock formation

See also
 Hansen (disambiguation)
 Henson (disambiguation)